Agustín Della Corte Bertoni (born 11 September 1997) is an Uruguay rugby union player who generally plays as a centre represents Uruguay internationally. He was included in the Uruguayan squad for the 2019 Rugby World Cup which is held in Japan for the first time and also marks his first World Cup appearance.

Career 
He made his international debut for Uruguay against Emerging Italy on 10 June 2017.

References 

1997 births
Living people
Uruguayan rugby union players
Uruguay international rugby union players
Rugby union centres
Peñarol Rugby players